Flor de Papel (Paper flower) 's the fourth album by Mexican rock singer Alejandra Guzmán. It was released in 1991 and became one of the most important female albums in Mexico. It won the Eres Award for Album of the Year and received a nomination for a Grammy Award for Best Latin Pop Album. The album title comes from a lyric in the song "Rosas Rojas".

Track listing
"Provocación" (C. Valle; J.R. Florez) — 03:32
"Quiero Armar Un Escándalo" (Di Felisatti; J.R. Florez) — 03:27
"Hacer el Amor Con Otro" (Gian Pietro Felisatti; José Vaca Flores) — 04:41
"Güera" (Di Felisatti; J.R. Florez) — 03:57
"La Ciudad Ardió"  (C. Valle; J.R. Florez) — 03:52
"Reina de Corazones"  (Queen Of Hearts)  (C. Valle; J.R. Florez) — 03:24
"Vivir Contra Corriente"  (Di Felisatti; J.R. Florez) — 03:41
"Rosas Rojas"  (C. Valle; J.R. Florez) — 05:04
"Me Cuesta Mucho Amarte"  (Di Felisatti; J.R. Florez) — 04:33
"Dame Un Martillo" (Di Felisatti; J.R. Florez; Miguel Blasco) — 02:46

References

1991 albums
Alejandra Guzmán albums
Fonovisa Records albums